Atlantis is a fictional location appearing in American comic books published by Marvel Comics. It is based on the mythical island of Atlantis first mentioned in Plato's initial dialogue the Timaeus, written c. 360 BC. In the Marvel Universe, Atlantis was a small continent (about the same size as modern Australia) with many human settlements. Over 21,000 years ago, an event called the "Great Cataclysm" caused it to be submerged into the sea.

Fictional history
The inhabitants of ancient Atlantis built an enormous glass-like dome over the capital city, also known as Atlantis. When barbarians sent by the Deviant Lemuria empire attacked Atlantis, King Kamuu opened the magma-pits which were the city's means of heating. This caused the continent to sink. Kamuu was warned of the Great Cataclysm by the seer, Zhered-Na. When she refused to recant, he had her exiled to the mainland, where she was later stabbed to death by survivors of the submersion.

The priests and intellectuals of the city Netheria foresaw the Lemurian attack and fortified their city, and thus it sank intact. Netheria still exists today, ruled by Queen Kala. Other ancient Atlanteans survived the sinking of the continent by various methods, including Dakimh the Enchanter, Varnae, and Stygyro.

About 8,000 years ago, a group of Homo mermanus nomads discovered the ruins of the city of Atlantis. They made the ruins of the human settlements in Atlantis their home and went on to develop a society there using as much of the material as they could salvage from the wreckage. These people are thus often referred to as "Atlanteans", as it is in the city of Atlantis that their first complex society emerged.

Five hundred years after the settlement of Atlantis, another group of Homo mermanus leave Atlantis to find their own city; this time in a part of the ruins of Lemuria, another continent submerged during the Great Cataclysm. These "Lemurians", as they now call themselves, discover the Serpent Crown in the ruins of their city. The Serpent Crown had been crafted by ancient Atlantean alchemists as a vessel empowered by the demonic Elder God Set. Through their leader Naga's exposure and extensive use of the ancient mystical device, they become more serpent-like in appearance than their Atlantean cousins.

Atlanteans have little or no contact with their human cousins for millennia. However, the two races come into sustained contact, often hostile, beginning in the 20th century. On occasions, Atlanteans invade the surface world. The current Prince, Namor the Sub-Mariner, is initially hostile to the surface world, but fights in alliance with the Allied Powers against the Axis Powers during World War II. Namor defends Atlantis against villains like Attuma and Warlord Krang, who plot to overthrow him and take over Atlantis.

The city of Atlantis is damaged when the super-villain Nitro explodes, taking with him Namor's traitorous son, Kamar.

Following Namor's attack on Wakanda during Avengers vs. X-Men, the two nations engage in a violent conflict. After much bloodshed, Namor reaches out to Black Panther and extends a peace offering to Queen Shuri. Despite this, Wakanda launches an all out strike on Atlantis, destroying the city and killing a number of Namor's soldiers in the process.

Reception
 In 2019, CBR.com ranked Atlantis 8th in their "10 Most Iconic Superhero Hideouts In Marvel Comics" list.
 In 2021, Screen Rant included Atlantis in their "10 Most Important Fictional Marvel Comics Countries" list.

Other versions

Exiles
The Exiles visited other realities that had their own version of Atlantis:

 On Earth-1016, the Exiles came across a reality where the forces of Atlantis were exterminating mankind. They teamed up with that reality's Doctor Doom to fend off the Atlanteans.

 Counter-Earth has its version of Atlantis. Proteus rose Atlantis to the surface and trapped the Atleanteans inside as a way to suffocate them.

Marvel Noir
In the Marvel Noir reality, Atlantis matched the descriptions of Plato with it being near the Pillars of Heracles, being highly-advanced, and powered by the Orichalcum. As the Orichalcum proved to be too powerful to be the Atlantean's superconductor, it created a vortex that sunk Atlantis beneath the ocean.

Ultimate Marvel
The ruins of the Ultimate Marvel version of Atlantis are discovered by the Fantastic Four during an expedition. Unlike its Earth-616 counterpart, this version of Atlantis is shown to have been devoid of any life for thousands of years. Upon being found by the Four, Namor suggests that the continent had been destroyed by Lemuria at some point during his time in stasis. During the Ultimatum storyline, it is revealed that the ruins of Atlantis do contain a small pocket of survivors led by Namora.

In other media

Television
 Atlantis was featured in the Sub-Mariner portion of The Marvel Super Heroes.
 Atlantis appears as Pacifica in the Fantastic Four (1967) episode "Danger in the Depths." It was featured as Pacifica due to the Atlantis name being used in The Marvel Super Heroes show at the time.
 Atlantis appears in the Fantastic Four (1994) episode "Wrath of the Sub-Mariner."
 Atlantis appears in The Avengers: United They Stand episode "To Rule Atlantis."
 Atlantis appears in the Fantastic Four: World's Greatest Heroes episode "Imperious Rex." The Fantastic Four visit Atlantis to get Namor to call off his sea monsters. In "Atlantis Attacks," Attuma attempts to take over Atlantis.
 Atlantis appears in Avengers Assemble.

Video games
 Atlantis appears as a level in Marvel: Ultimate Alliance. With sonic emitters supplied to them by Doctor Doom and his Masters of Evil, Attuma takes over Atlantis with the help of Tiger Shark, Warlord Krang, and Byrrah. The player relies on a special nanite injection to breathe underwater during the level.

References

External links
 Atlantis at Marvel.com
 Atlantis at Marvel Wiki

Marvel Comics
Marvel Comics locations